Graecoanatolica kocapinarica is a species of freshwater snail, an aquatic gastropod mollusk in the family Hydrobiidae. The species is endemic to a spring outside Aşağı Gökdere Village in Turkey.

References

Hydrobiidae
Graecoanatolica
Gastropods described in 1973
Endemic fauna of Turkey